Goole Academy, is a mixed 11–18 secondary school located in Goole, East Riding of Yorkshire, England. It is situated just off the A614 road in the east of Goole.

History
The school's original motto was Alta Pete, Latin for "Aim High".

Grammar school
Goole Academy was first opened as Goole Grammar School in 1909, making it the longest running school in Goole. It was administered by West Riding County Council, based in Wakefield. It was a four form-entry coeducational school on Boothferry Road with 750 boys and girls. Goole Secondary Modern School was on the opposite side of Boothferry Road, which was built in 1936, and had 1,100 boys and girls.

Comprehensive
In September 1973 the school became a twelve form-entry comprehensive upper school for ages 13–18. It initially retained the name Goole Grammar School with 1,100 boys and girls. From April 1974 it was administered by Humberside Education Committee. The former secondary modern school became Bartholomew Middle School (became Goole College, now part of Hull College).

In the 1980s the school was still a 13–18 upper school and called Goole Grammar School. In 1990 the school's name was changed to Vermuyden School, after Cornelius Vermuyden.

In 2009, following consultation with students and the local community, it was renamed Goole High School and, after a student survey, a new school uniform was introduced. The motto was also changed to 'Daring to be Excellent'.

Academy
Goole Academy officially gained academy status in 2011. The school receives funding directly from central government but still has links with the East Riding of Yorkshire Council.

The school underwent transformation with a stage two of a £15 million new build. Subsequently, partly through the school being one of the first three nationally to receive funding through the government's Priority Schools Building Fund, a further multi-million pound sum is to be spent on the next phase of the creation of a three-storey new build to house the CREATE Studio School, an  Academy School suite and a creative arts suite, with drama and dance halls, and a library.

It will also fund renovation of the original Edwardian building and reinstatement of the Edwardian listed gardens fronting Boothferry Road, the return of the car park on Airmyn Road to tennis courts and the demolition of some non-historical parts of the site to make way for the creation of landscaped outside areas.

As an Academy, the school quickly began to improve all aspects of its provision, including some of the best results in its history. When the Academy was removed from Special Measures, Ofsted described it as having been transformed "beyond recognition" (November 2015).

Academic performance
The school had its best GCSE results in 2019.

Alumni

Goole Grammar School
 Gavin Bryars, composer
 Edwin Dawes, Reckitt Professor of Biochemistry from 1963-90 at the University of Hull (head of biochemistry from 1963–86), editor from 1976 to 1981 of the Journal of General Microbiology and from 1958-65 of the Biochemical Journal, and chairman since 1995 of the Philip Larkin Society
 Colin Graves, founder and chairman of Costcutter
 Philip Hall, professor of applied mathematics since 1996 at Imperial College London
 John Brian Helliwell, mathematician 
 Barrie Rickards, professor of palaeontology and biostratigraphy from 2000 to 2005 at the University of Cambridge
 Norman Mahalski, later Norman Scott, Second World War codebreaker, Bletchley Park.
 Gwilym Pryce, professor of urban economics and social statistics from 1996 to 2014 at the University of Glasgow, and from 2014 at the University of Sheffield.

See also
 Cornelius Vermuyden School and Arts College in Essex

References

External links
 
 History of the school
 EduBase

News items
 Funding in October 2005

Academies in the East Riding of Yorkshire
Educational institutions established in 1909
Goole
Secondary schools in the East Riding of Yorkshire
1909 establishments in England
Delta schools